is a Japanese politician of the Liberal Democratic Party, was a member of the House of Representatives in the Diet. A native of Niihama, Ehime. He graduated the University of Tokyo and received a master's degree in aerospace engineering. He was elected to the Ehime Prefectural Assembly member in 1983, and then to the House of Representatives in 1993.

In 2008, he expressed the intention not to stand as a candidate for the next general election, and left the national political arena with the dissolution of the House of Representatives in 2009.

He is working as "a politician out of power" now, and has published the monthly magazine "OAK-TREE".

External links 
 Official website in Japanese.

1955 births
Living people
Politicians from Ehime Prefecture
University of Tokyo alumni
Members of the House of Representatives (Japan)
Liberal Democratic Party (Japan) politicians
21st-century Japanese politicians
People from Niihama, Ehime